Sanvitalia ), the creeping zinnias, is a genus of flowering plants belonging to the family Asteraceae. They are native to mostly to Mexico, with a few species in Central America, South America, and the Southwestern United States.

 Species
 Sanvitalia abertii A.Gray - Abert's creeping zinnia - Mexico (Sonora), southwestern United States (CA NV AZ NM TX)
 Sanvitalia acapulcensis (DC.) Benth. & Hook.f. ex Hemsl. - Guerrero
 Sanvitalia angustifolia Engelm. ex A.Gray - Coahuila, Chihuahua, Guanajuato, Nuevo León, San Luis Potosí; introduced in western Texas
 Sanvitalia fruticosa Hemsl. - Puebla, Oaxaca, Guanajuato
 Sanvitalia ocymoides  DC. -- yellow creeping zinnia - Tamaulipas, Nuevo León, Texas
 Sanvitalia procumbens Lam. - Mexican creeping zinnia - Mexico from Chihuahua to Chiapas; Central America; naturalized in scattered locations in Europe, East Asia, South America, and United States
 Sanvitalia versicolor Griseb. - Bolivia, Paraguay, Argentina

Note: Sanvitalia speciosa is a term commonly used in the horticultural trade, but this is not a validly published name. Many specimens so labelled are not even Sanvitalia, and is most likely Melampodium.

References

External links
 
 
 
 

Heliantheae
Asteraceae genera